Miocallicebus is an extinct genus of New World monkeys from the Middle Miocene (Laventan in the South American land mammal ages; 13.8 to 11.8 mya). Its remains have been found at the Konzentrat-Lagerstätte of La Venta in the Honda Group of Colombia. The type species is Miocallicebus villaviejai.

Etymology 
Miocallicebus is derived from the Greek name for the modern genus of titis, Callicebus, with the prefix Mio for Miocene. The species epithet refers to Villavieja, a village close to where the fossil remains were found.

Description 
Fossils of Miocallicebus were discovered in 1997 during a field study executed by researchers of the Primate Research Institute of Kyoto University. The specimen consists of a right maxillary fragment preserving a root of M1, a complete M2, and a badly damaged M3, discovered at the Bolivia Site in the Tatacoa Desert of Huila, south-central Colombia. The genus has not been found in the "Monkey Beds" of La Venta. The fossil remains were uncovered just above the Tatacoa Sandstone Beds of the La Victoria Formation, which has been dated to the Laventan with a range from 13.86 to 12.38 mya.

However, it may be phylogenically nestled within Callicebus, which would warrant a replacement of the species to be in that genus.

The evolutionary split between Pitheciidae of Cebupithecia from the Honda Group and Callicebus, including Miocallicebus, has been placed at 15.2 mya.

Habitat 

The Honda Group, and more precisely the "Monkey Beds", are the richest site for fossil primates in South America. It has been argued that the monkeys of the Honda Group were living in habitat that was in contact with the Amazon and Orinoco Basins, and that La Venta itself was probably seasonally dry forest.

See also 

 List of primates of Colombia
 Stirtonia (monkey)

References

Bibliography

Further reading 
 
 

Prehistoric primate genera
Prehistoric monkeys
†Miocallicebus
Miocene genus first appearances
Miocene extinctions
Miocene primates of South America
Laventan
Neogene Colombia
Fossils of Colombia
Honda Group, Colombia
Fossil taxa described in 2001